Mans or MANS may refer to:

 Something people can refer to someone as used in the same way as Dude
 Le Mans (Mans), a city in France
 24 Hours of Le Mans, a motor race
 Måns, a Swedish given name
 Mans (surname)
 Arrondissement du Mans, an arrondissement of France
 Maharashtra Andhashraddha Nirmoolan Samiti, a skeptic organization in Maharashtra, India
 Mansoura University
 Marine Aerial Navigation School, part of the Marine Aviation Training Support Group 22history|]]

See also
 Le Mans (disambiguation)
 Man (disambiguation)
 Men (disambiguation)